Apillapampa is a small town in Bolivia. In 2010 it had an estimated population of 1478.

References

Populated places in Cochabamba Department